Josephine Ettel Kablick (March 9, 1787 – July 21, 1863) was a pioneering Czech botanist and paleontologist. Kablick studied under the best botanists of her time. She collected plant and fossil samples  for institutions throughout Europe. Many of the fossils and plants she collected are named in her honor.

Life
Kablick lived in the Czech city of Vrchlabí (then Hohenelbe). She was extremely strong and healthy and became an enthusiastic collector of specimens in all weathers. She collected plant and fossil samples especially from the Sudeten Mountains for schools, museums, learned societies  and universities throughout Europe.

Kablick created her own herbarium to hold her collections of plants that she collected. She especially liked lichens. She was not discouraged by bad weather and ventured into the field to "traipse through forest and climb high mountains in order to search for new species of plants and  fossils."

Filip Maximilian Opiz's  Interchangeable Institute for the exchange of herbarium specimens (German Pflanzentausch-Anstalt)  lists over 25,000 specimens collected by her.

Her husband Adalbert Kablik was a pharmacologist and zoologist and very supportive of his wife's occupation for 50 years. 

Her name is sometimes spelled Josefina Kablíková.

References

Sources
The Biographical Dictionary of Women in Science By Marilyn Bailey Ogilvie and Joy Harvey. Published Taylor & Francis (2000). . Accessed April 2008
The Hidden Giants By Sethanne Howard, Published 2007, Lulu.com. . Accessed April 2008
 Biographisches Lexikon des Kaiserthums Oesterreich German wikisource. Accessed February 2014.

1787 births
1863 deaths
Czech botanists
Czech paleontologists
19th-century Czech people
Czech women scientists
Women botanists
Women paleontologists
19th-century women scientists